The  was a field army of the Imperial Japanese Army during World War II.

History
It was renamed the Japanese Thirty-ninth Army on December 14, 1944, and became the 18th Area Army on July 7, 1945, shortly before the end of the Pacific War.

The 18th Area Army was under the control of the Southern Expeditionary Army Group as a military reserve and garrison force, ostensibly to help defend the Empire of Japan's nominal ally, the Kingdom of Thailand against possible invasion by the Allies, but in more practical terms, it was present to ensure that Thailand remained an ally to Japan. It was headquartered in Bangkok.

The 18th Area Army was demobilized in Bangkok at the surrender of Japan on August 15, 1945, without having seen combat.

List of Commanders

Commanding officer

Chief of Staff

References

Citation

Books

External links

18
Military units and formations established in 1943
Military units and formations disestablished in 1945